Mount Victoria is a mountain in the Mount Victoria Forest Reserve in north-east Tasmania, Australia, and also forms part of the Ben Lomond bioregion and the Ben Lomond National Park. It is a prominent feature of the reserve, and is a popular venue with bushwalkers.

Mount Victoria Forest Reserve has a picnic area, barbeque facilities and toilets. Ralph Falls can be accessed from the Reserve. Ralph Falls is one of Tasmania's highest waterfalls and Tasmania's highest single drop waterfall.

See also

 List of highest mountains of Tasmania

References

External links
 Parks Tasmania

Victoria
North East Tasmania